The 63rd Filmfare Awards South ceremony honouring the winners and nominees of the best of South Indian cinema in 2015 is an event held on 18 June 2016 at the Hyderabad International Convention Centre.

List of nominees

Main awards
Winners are listed first, highlighted in boldface.

Kannada cinema

Malayalam cinema

Tamil cinema

Telugu cinema

Technical Awards

Special awards

References

General

Specific

External links
 
 

Filmfare Awards South
2015 Indian film awards